Suzanne Johnston (born 1958) is an Australian operatic mezzo-soprano who first performed professionally in 1981.

Born in the Melbourne suburb of Murrumbeena, Johnston attended Kilvington Grammar School. She then had singing lessons at the Victorian College of the Arts with Joan Hammond.

Along with Judi Connelli she won the 1999 ARIA Award for Best Original Cast or Show Album for their album Perfect Strangers.

Johnston and Connelli have performed the cabaret shows Perfect Strangers and Take Two! around Australia. The pair, first with Jennifer McGregor and later Rosemary Boyle, were part of the 3 Divas who have toured nationally and released a self-titled album in 2000.

Awards

ARIA Music Awards
The ARIA Music Awards is an annual ceremony presented by Australian Recording Industry Association (ARIA), which recognise excellence, innovation, and achievement across all genres of the music of Australia. They commenced in 1987.

! 
|-
|rowspan="2" | 1999|| Perfect Strangers (with Judi Connelli) ||rowspan="2" | ARIA Award for Best Original Soundtrack, Cast or Show Album ||  ||rowspan="2" |  
|-
| Hansel and Gretel (with Opera Australia, Christine Douglas) ||

Mo Awards
The Australian Entertainment Mo Awards (commonly known informally as the Mo Awards), were annual Australian entertainment industry awards. They recognise achievements in live entertainment in Australia from 1975 to 2016. Suzanne Johnston won one award in that time.
 (wins only)
|-
| 1992
| Suzanne Johnston
| Operatic Performance of the Year
| 
|-

References

External links
Profile, Opera Australia

1958 births
Living people
Operatic mezzo-sopranos
20th-century Australian women opera singers
Singers from Melbourne
People from Murrumbeena, Victoria
Victorian College of the Arts alumni